Ciurea is a surname. Notable people with the surname include:

Aurelia Ciurea (born 1982), Romanian gymnast
Constantin Stamati-Ciurea (1828–1898), Romanian writer and translator
Cornel Ciurea (born 1972), Moldovan politician
Tudorancea Ciurea (1888–1971), Romanian army general

Romanian-language surnames